Germonea rachelae is a species of sea snail, a marine gastropod mollusk in the family Buccinidae.

Description
The shells of most species of sea snails are spirally coiled.

Distribution
The deep-sea of the Scotia Sea and adjacent abyssal plains and trenches.

References

External links

Buccinidae
Gastropods described in 2004